Grabe is a village and a quarter of the town of Mühlhausen in Thuringia, central Germany. It consists of the settlements Kleingrabe (Smaller Grabe) and Großgrabe (Greater Grabe).

Geography 
The Volkenroda Abbey in the neighbourhood can easily be reached on foot from Grabe. The village is connected to the Landesstraße (state's road) 249. The terrain is hilly and lies on the edge of the Thuringian basin and the Unstrut lowlands. The stream Notter flows through Grabe.

History 

Großgrabe and Kleingrabe were first mentioned in a document on 17 July 997.
On 4 June 1300, Landgrave Frederick I sold the village together with Bollstedt and Höngeda to the Reichsstadt (imperial city) of Mühlhausen.
In 1565, there were 58 inhabitants in Wester-Grabe (Großgrabe) and 42 in Oster-Grabe (Kleingrabe).

In 1802, Großgrabe and Kleingrabe, together with Mühlhausen, fell to the Kingdom of Prussia, from 1807 to 1813 to the Kingdom of Westphalia (Dachrieden canton) created by Napoleon, and after the Congress of Vienna in 1816, they were assigned to the district of Mühlhausen i. Th. in the Prussian province of Saxony. The municipalities of Großgrabe and Kleingrabe were merged in 1965 to form the municipality of Grabe.

The village, which has always been agricultural, found new forms of ownership to work the land after 1990. With equestrian sports, the connection to the city is further strengthened.

On 30 June 1994, Grabe became part of the newly created municipality of Weinbergen.
Since 1 January 2019, when the municipality of Weinbergen was dissolved and its villages joined the town of Mühlhausen, it has been a quarter of that town.

Sights 

 
 Ruins of St Albanus's Church in Kleingrabe
 Furthmühle (Furth mill)

Transport 
Grabe station was on the Ebeleben–Mühlhausen railway line. Freight traffic was discontinued at the end of 1994 and passenger traffic on 31 May 1997. The line has been closed since 15 August 1998.

Bibliography

References

External links 

Mühlhausen
Former municipalities in Thuringia